"Violations" is the 112th episode of the American science fiction television series Star Trek: The Next Generation, the 12th episode of the fifth season.

Set in the 24th century, the series follows the adventures of the Starfleet crew of the Federation starship Enterprise-D. In this episode, a member of an alien delegation traveling on the USS Enterprise molests members of the crew using telepathy.

Plot
The Federation starship Enterprise conveys a delegation of Ullians to Calder IV. Tarmin, their leader, explains that Ullians are telepathic historians who conduct their research by retrieving long forgotten memories, and demonstrating this on volunteers by helping Keiko O'Brien recall a lost childhood memory, and revealing Dr. Crusher is thinking about her first kiss. Tarmin continues to explain that their abilities require years of training, and his son Jev, also part of the delegation, has not yet reached his potential. Jev is upset at this implication and leaves. Counselor Deanna Troi follows and talks to him, pointing out that her own mother, Lwaxana Troi, is also quite overbearing. After finding a common bond, Troi leaves for her quarters. While there, she recalls a romantic interlude with Commander William Riker, but as the memory gets more intense, Riker begins to assault Deanna, ignoring Deanna's screams of "No!". Suddenly, Riker is replaced by Jev. Troi screams out in pain and collapses, later to be found in a coma.

Riker speaks to Jev as the last person seen talking to Troi, and asks if he would submit to medical tests to make sure the Ullians do not carry any harmful toxins or pathogens. Jev agrees, but later Riker suffers from a similar flashback and also collapses. Dr. Crusher's tests reveal nothing, but her scans of Troi and Riker show an electropathic activity typical of a rare neurological disorder, Iresine Syndrome. Captain Picard asks the Ullians if they would allow for further scanning, which Tarmin agrees to. None of the Ullians, nor any of their volunteers during the demonstration, show this disorder. Later, Dr. Crusher succumbs to a similar flashback, and Picard puts Lt. Commander Data and Chief Engineer Geordi La Forge in charge of the investigation. Following Dr. Crusher's research, Geordi looks to other cases of Iresine Syndrome in Federation records, eventually discovering two that occurred on Hurada III while a Ullian delegation was present. Picard requests the Ullians to confine themselves to quarters until they resolve the issue.

Troi wakes from her coma, and when news of this arrives to Jev, he requests to help probe Troi's mind to find out what happened. Picard allows it, and with Jev's help, Troi recounts the memory, ending with the replacement of Riker by Tarmin. Jev asserts that for his people, forcefully inserting oneself into a memory is a crime, and contacts his homeworld to let them know of Tarmin's crime. As they near their destination, Jev comes to say goodbye to Troi, apologizing for his father. When Troi offers sympathy, Jev engages another mind probe, causing the same memory to occur for Troi. Just then, security personnel arrive and take Jev into custody; Data and La Forge had discovered two additional instances of unexplained comas on Nel III, and that Tarmin was on his home planet at that time. As the Enterprise sets course for the Ullian homeworld, Tarmin is cleared, and Riker and Dr. Crusher recover from their comas.

External links

Star Trek: The Next Generation (season 5) episodes
1992 American television episodes
Television episodes about telepathy